In France, although the formation of a shadow cabinet (French: contre-gouvernement) is neither compulsory nor common, several have been formed.

Shadow Cabinet of The Republicans (2018) 
On 21 November 2018, Laurent Wauquiez, president of The Republicans, the largest opposition party in Parliament, announced the formation of a shadow cabinet:
 Affaires étrangères (Foreign Affairs): Pascal Allizard
 Égalité Femmes-Hommes et lutte contre les discriminations (Equality Women-Men and Fight Against Discriminations): Emmanuelle Anthoine
 Jeunesse et Sports (Youth and Sports): Laurence Arribagé
 Logement (Housing): Thibault Bazin
 Professions libérales (Liberal Professions): Valérie Bazin-Malgras
 Famille (Family): Valérie Beauvais
 Tourisme (Tourism): Émilie Bonnivard
 Politique de la Ville (Policy of the City): Ian Boucard
 Justice (Justice): François-Noël Buffet
 Intérieur (Interior): Éric Ciotti
 Travail et Apprentissage (Labour and Training): Pierre Cordier
 Aménagement du territoire et de la Montagne (Spatial and Mountain Planning): Marie-Christine Dalloz
 Immigration (Immigration): Pierre-Henri Dumont
 Agriculture: Laurent Duplomb
 Commerce et Artisanat (Trade and Craft): Pascale Gruny
 Ruralité (Rurality): Guillaume Guérin
 Éducation (Education): Patrick Hetzel
 Santé (Health): Philippe Juvin
 Culture: Brigitte Kuster
 Collectivités territoriales (Local Collectivities): Nicolas Lacroix
 Transports: Valérie Lacroute
 Affaires européennes (European Affairs): Constance Le Grip
 Outre-Mer (Overseas): David Lorion
 Finances publiques (Public Finance): Véronique Louwagie
 Industrie (Industry): Olivier Marleix
 Défense (Defence): Philippe Meunier
 Économie du Numérique (Digital Economy): Christelle Morançais 
 Lien intergénérationnel et Grand âge (Intergenerational link and Older age): Sylviane Noël
 Coopération et Développement (Cooperation and Decelopment): Bérengère Poletti
 Handicap: Aurélien Pradié
 Emploi (Employment): Frédérique Puissat
 Écologie et Développement durable (Ecology and Sustainable development): Martial Saddier
 Enseignement Supérieur (Higher Education): Antoine Savignat
 Énergie (Energy): Raphaël Schellenberger

References

Politics of France
Shadow cabinets